American Foreign Policy: Three Essays is a 1969 book by Henry Kissinger that outlines his views of the international political structure. It is composed of essays on diplomacy and several speeches he made during his political career.

References

1969 non-fiction books
Non-fiction books about diplomacy
Books by Henry Kissinger
W. W. Norton & Company books